Dreaming of a Jewish Christmas is a Canadian documentary film, directed by Larry Weinstein and released in 2017. The film profiles a number of musicians, including Irving Berlin, Mel Tormé, Jay Livingston, Ray Evans, Gloria Shayne Baker and Johnny Marks, who made a mark on contemporary culture by writing many of the most beloved Christmas music standards even though they were Jewish rather than Christian; it focuses, in particular, on the way these songwriters helped to create the 20th-century shift from traditional liturgical Christmas music toward contemporary pop songs that address Christmas through universal themes of love, joy, peace, family and the sensual pleasures of winter rather than explicitly religious imagery. The young Larry is portrayed by Decker Williams in this documentary and it takes place in a Chinese restaurant where he and his family enters on about December 25, 1961.

The film incorporates interview segments with figures such as musician Ben Sidran, comedians Jackie Mason and Mark Breslin and music writers Rob Bowman, Ophira Eisenberg and Robert Harris, interspersed with musical performances of some of the songs being discussed. Performing musicians include Steven Page, Tom Wilson, The Lemon Bucket Orkestra, David Wall, Dione Taylor, Kevin Breit and Aviva Chernick.

The film premiered on CBC Television in December 2017, and received further broadcasts on the Documentary Channel. In the United States, the film has aired on some PBS stations and has received selected theatrical screenings at Jewish film festivals.

Weinstein won the Canadian Screen Award for Best Direction in a Documentary Program at the 7th Canadian Screen Awards. The film was also nominated for Best Biography or Arts Documentary Program or Series, Best Sound in a Non-Fiction Program or Series (Gary Vaughan and Richard Spence-Thomas) and Best Writing in a Documentary Program (Jason Charters). At the 46th International Emmy Awards, the film was a shortlisted nominee for Best Arts Programming.

Songlist
 Winter Wonderland (English version) - performed by Gaston Poon, Franc-Anton Harwart and the waiters
 The Christmas Song - lead vocals by Dione Taylor
 A Holly Jolly Christmas - performed by Roger Feng, the cooks and the lion dancers
 Silver Bells - lead vocals by Steven Page
 Rudolph the Red-Nosed Reindeer - performed by Tom Wilson and the Lemon Bucket Orkestra
 Do You Hear What I Hear? - sung by Aviva Chernick
 Winter Wonderland Reprise - Yiddish vocals by David Wall with the waiters' backing vocals

References

External links

2017 films
2017 documentary films
Canadian documentary television films
Jewish Canadian films
Documentary films about Jews and Judaism
Documentary films about music and musicians
Canadian musical films
Canadian Christmas films
2010s English-language films
2010s Canadian films